The 2000 Melbourne Cup was the 140th running of the Melbourne Cup, a prestigious Australian Thoroughbred horse race.

It was won by Brew, trained by Michael Moroney and ridden by Kerrin McEvoy.

Field

This is a list of horses which ran in the 2000 Melbourne Cup.

References

2000
Melbourne Cup
Melbourne Cup
20th century in Melbourne
2000s in Melbourne
November 2000 sports events in Australia